The Council Grove Methodist Church is a historic church on Osage Mills Road in Osage Mills, Arkansas.  It is a small single-story wood-frame structure with a steeply pitched gable roof.  Its cornerboards have plain capitals, and its main entrance is sheltered by a shed-roof hood supported by brackets.  Built c. 1890, it is a fine local example of vernacular rural church architecture.

The church was listed on the National Register of Historic Places in 1988.

See also
National Register of Historic Places listings in Benton County, Arkansas

References

Methodist churches in Arkansas
Churches on the National Register of Historic Places in Arkansas
Churches completed in 1890
Churches in Benton County, Arkansas
National Register of Historic Places in Benton County, Arkansas
1890 establishments in Arkansas